The AFC second round of 2006 FIFA World Cup qualification began on 18 February 2004 and finished on 17 November 2004.

The highest-ranked country in each group at the end of the stage progressed to the third round, where the eight remaining teams were divided into two groups of four.

Format
The 32 teams (25 teams given a bye directly to the second round and 7 winners from the play-off round) were split into five groups of four teams each – with all teams playing home and away against each of the other three teams in the group.

The highest-ranked team in each group qualified for the third round.

Group 1

Group 2

Group 3

Group 4

Group 5

Group 6

Group 7

Group 8

References

External links
2006 FIFA World Cup qualification (AFC) at RSSSF.com
2006 FIFA World Cup qualification (AFC) at FIFA.com

 
2006 FIFA World Cup qualification (AFC)
Qual